Istanbul Atlas University is a non-profit private university in Istanbul, Turkey. Atlas University founded in 2018, started education in Kâğıthane Vadi Campus in 2020. Atlas University offers 11 associate degree, 22 undergraduate and 5 graduate programs. The University accepts international students from various countries.

Faculties, schools and programs 
Atlas University has the following academic units:

Medical School (English and Turkish)

Faculty of Dentistry (English and Turkish)

Faculty of Engineering and Natural Sciences  

 Computer Engineering (Turkish)
 Industrial Engineering (English)
 Interior Architecture and Environmental Design (Turkish)
 Molecular Biology and Genetics (English)
 Software Engineering (English)

Faculty of Humanities and Social Sciences  

 Business (English)
 English Language and Literature (English)
 Psychology (English and Turkish)
 Translator Translation (English)

Faculty of Health Sciences  

 Language and Speech Therapy (English and Turkish)
 Midwifery (Turkish)
 Nursing (English and Turkish)
 Nutrition and Dietetics (Turkish)
 Occupational Therapy (Turkish)
 Physical Therapy and Rehabilitation (Turkish)

Graduate Education Institute  

 Language and Speech Therapy
 Midwifery
 Nutrition and Dietetics
 Occupational Therapy
 Physical Therapy and Rehabilitation

Vocational School (Turkish)  

 Anesthesia
 Dental Prosthetic Technology
 Dialysis
 Disinfection, Sterilization and Antisepsy
 First and Emergency Aid
 Medical Imaging Techniques
 Medical Laboratory Techniques
 Mouth and Dental Health
 Operating Room Services
 Optician
 Physiotherapy

People 
 Dr. Yusuf Elgörmüş, Chairman
 Prof. Mustafa Küçük, Rector
 Naciye Seymenoğlu Torpil, Secretary General

References

External links 
 Atlas University homepage
 Atlas University Medicine Hospital homepage

Educational institutions established in 2018
2018 establishments in Turkey
Universities and colleges in Turkey